Otto Toeplitz (1 August 1881 – 15 February 1940) was a German mathematician working in functional analysis.

Life and work 

Toeplitz was born to a Jewish family of mathematicians. Both his father and grandfather were Gymnasium mathematics teachers and published papers in mathematics. Toeplitz grew up in Breslau and graduated from the Gymnasium there. He then studied mathematics at the University of Breslau and was awarded a doctorate in algebraic geometry in 1905. In 1906 Toeplitz arrived at Göttingen University, which was then the world's leading mathematical center, and he remained there for seven years. The mathematics faculty included David Hilbert, Felix Klein, and Hermann Minkowski. Toeplitz joined a group of young people working with Hilbert: Max Born, Richard Courant and Ernst Hellinger, with whom he collaborated for many years afterward. At that time Toeplitz began to rework the theory of linear functionals and quadratic forms on n-dimensional spaces for infinite dimensional spaces. He wrote five papers directly related to spectral theory of operators which Hilbert was developing. During this period he also published a paper on summation processes and discovered the basic ideas of what are now called the Toeplitz operators. In 1913 Toeplitz became an extraordinary professor at the University of Kiel. He was promoted to a professor in 1920.

In 1911, Toeplitz proposed the inscribed square problem:

 Does every Jordan curve contain an inscribed square?

This has been established for convex curves and smooth curves, but the question remains open in general (2007).

Together with Hans Rademacher, he wrote a classic of popular mathematics Von Zahlen und Figuren, which was first published in 1930 and later translated into English as Enjoyment of Mathematics.

Toeplitz was deeply interested in the history of mathematics. In 1929, he cofounded "Quellen und Studien zur Geschichte der Mathematik" with Otto Neugebauer and Julius Stenzel. Beginning in the 1920s, Toeplitz advocated a "genetic method" in teaching of mathematics, which he applied in writing the book Entwicklung der Infinitesimalrechnung ("The Calculus: A Genetic Approach"). The book introduces the subject by giving an idealized historical narrative to motivate the concepts, showing how they developed from classical problems of Greek mathematics. It was left unfinished, edited by Gottfried Köthe and posthumously published in German in 1946 (English translation: 1963).

In 1928 Toeplitz succeeded Eduard Study at Bonn University. In 1933, the Civil Service Law came into effect and professors of Jewish origin were removed from teaching. Initially, Toeplitz was able to retain his position due to an exception for those who had been appointed before 1914, but he was nonetheless dismissed in 1935. In 1939 he emigrated to Mandatory Palestine, where he was scientific advisor to the rector of the Hebrew University of Jerusalem. He died in Jerusalem from tuberculosis a year later.

Quotes 

Here is how Gottfried Köthe, who was Toeplitz's assistant in Bonn, described their collaboration:

In his own words:

Books 
 Hans Rademacher and Otto Toeplitz, The Enjoyment of Mathematics: Selections from Mathematics for the Amateur (translated by Herbert Zuckerman), Princeton University Press, 1957
 Otto Toeplitz, The calculus: a genetic approach, The University of Chicago Press, 2007

See also
 Calderón–Toeplitz operator
 Silverman–Toeplitz theorem
 Hellinger–Toeplitz theorem
 Toeplitz algebra
 Toeplitz matrix
 Inscribed square problem

Notes

References
 Heinrich Behnke, The man and the teacher and Gottfried Köthe, Scientific works (translated from German by N. Elyoseph). Integral Equations and Operator Theory 4 (1981), no. 2, 281–288, 289–297

External links

1881 births
1940 deaths
Scientists from Wrocław
People from the Province of Silesia
20th-century German mathematicians
Mathematics popularizers
Jewish emigrants from Nazi Germany to Mandatory Palestine
Academic staff of the University of Bonn
Mathematical analysts
Functional analysts